The Dublin Intelligence was an Irish newspaper published from at least September 30, 1690 until at least May 21, 1724.

In 1702, the paper was published by Cornelius Carter and printed at the back of Dick's coffee house. As well as news gleaned from the coffee house  patrons, its international news was taken from London and Dublin newspapers, packets and foreign correspondence arriving by ship.

See also 
 Burney Collection of Newspapers

References

Newspapers published in Ireland
Mass media in County Dublin
1690 establishments in the British Empire